Naane Raja Naane Mandhiri is a 1985 Tamil-language comedy drama film, directed by Balu Anand and produced by Thooyavan. The film stars Vijayakanth, Raadhika, Jeevitha, Goundamani and Senthil. It was remade in Telugu as Nene Raja Nene Mantri (1987).

Cast

Vijayakanth as Rangamani
Raadhika as Bhagyalakshmi
Jeevitha as Savithri
Goundamani as Kuppusamy
Senthil as Naakuthuruthi
Sivaraman as Puliyankottai
Vasantha
Kovai Sarala as Subbatha
C. R. Parthiban as Drama Troupe Harmonist
Kumarimuthu
Idichapuli Selvaraj
Kullamani as Kulaiyan
Tirupur Ramasamy as Ramasamy
Swaminathan as Kathavarayan
Manimaran as Marudhu

Production
Balu Anand, who worked as an assistant to R. Sundarrajan made his directorial debut with this film.

Soundtrack
The music was composed by Ilaiyaraaja and proved to be successful

Reception
Jayamanmadhan of Kalki wrote the film which went briskly went lame till the climax. The critic however praised the humour and Ilaiyaraaja's music.

References

External links

 

1985 films
Films scored by Ilaiyaraaja
1980s Tamil-language films
Indian comedy-drama films
Tamil films remade in other languages
1985 directorial debut films
Films directed by Balu Anand
1985 comedy-drama films